Toombs is a surname. Notable people with the name include:
 Kenneth Toombs (1928-2008), 20th-century American academic librarian
Robert Toombs (1810-1885), U.S. Senator, first Secretary of State of the Confederacy and Confederate general
Roderick Toombs, better known as Roddy Piper (1954–2015), Canadian professional wrestler and actor
Rudy Toombs (c. 1914-1962), American songwriter
Sam Toombs (1871-1949), Australian politician

See also
Toombs County, Georgia